Land 2 Air Chronicles II: Imitation Is Suicide Chapter 1 is an EP by American singer-songwriter Kenna. It is the first of three EPs in the Land 2 Air Chronicles II series, released from September 2013 to December 2013.  "Relations (An Ode to You and Me)" was released as a single to promote the EP. A remix featuring Childish Gambino was released on November 12.

Track listing

Personnel 
Producer – Chad Hugo, Kenna

References 

Kenna albums
2013 EPs